Kevin M. Stacom (born September 4, 1951) is a retired American professional basketball player.

A 6'3" (1.90 m) guard from Holy Cross High School, Flushing, New York; and   Providence College, Stacom played six seasons (1974–1979; 1981–1982) in the National Basketball Association as a member of the Boston Celtics, Indiana Pacers, and Milwaukee Bucks.  He averaged 5.1 points per game in his career and won a league championship with Boston in 1976.

Stacom was head coach of the Rhode Island Gulls during the 1985 United States Basketball League season.

References

External links

1951 births
Living people
All-American college men's basketball players
American men's basketball players
Basketball players from New York City
Boston Celtics draft picks
Boston Celtics players
Chicago Bulls draft picks
Holy Cross Crusaders men's basketball players
Holy Cross High School (Flushing) alumni
Indiana Pacers players
Maine Lumberjacks players
Milwaukee Bucks players
Providence Friars men's basketball players
Shooting guards
United States Basketball League coaches